Flemming Serritslev (born 18 February 1947) is a Danish footballer, coach and manager who is currently head coach of the Fiji national team.

Biography
Serritslev played most of his career for Vejle Boldklub in a successful period. Thus, Serritslev was part of a team that won the Danish championship in 1972 and the Danish Cup in 1972, 1975 and 1977.

As manager Flemming Serritslev ensured Danish side B1909 a place in the best Danish league in 1990. In 1992, he became assistant manager of the Danish national team before he went on to become head coach of the Danish U21 team. In 2006 Serritslev returned to his childhood club Vejle as sports manager. However, Serritslev and the new board at the club could not work together and Serritslev left Vejle Boldklub only six-month after his appointment.

On 1 July 2010, he was appointed as technical manager of Mes Kerman in Iran Pro League and also head coach of Mes B. On 25 August 2011, after the resignation of Mes head coach Samad Marfavi, he was appointed as caretaker manager of club but was replaced with Miroslav Blažević without managing team in any match.

On 23 November 2015, he became new manager of the Papua New Guinea national football team. On 5 June 2016, he guided Papua New Guinea to the semi finals of the OFC Nations Cup for the first time. Papua New Guinea beat Solomon Islands 2–1, before losing the final to New Zealand in a penalty shoot-out.

Honours

As manager

Papua New Guinea
OFC Nations Cup Runners-up: 2016

Managerial statistics

References

External links

 Flemming Serritslev Interview
 Flemming Serritslev Interview with Bold 

1947 births
Living people
Danish men's footballers
Vejle Boldklub players
Danish football managers
Ikast FS managers
Expatriate football managers in Nigeria
Boldklubben 1909 managers
Expatriate football managers in Fiji
Fiji national football team managers
Kolding IF managers
Association football midfielders
Danish expatriate football managers
Footballers from Copenhagen